Hanbidge is a surname. Notable people with the surname include:

 Liz Hanbidge, American politician
 Robert Hanbidge (1891–1974), Canadian lawyer and politician

See also
 Hambidge